Gwion Hallam is a Welsh writer and television presenter from Ammanford, Carmarthenshire. He now lives with his family in Y Felinheli, North Wales. His brother, Tudur Hallam, won the Chair at the National Eisteddfod in 2010.

His book, Creadyn, won the 2006 Best Welsh-Language Book (Secondary Sector) in the Tir na n-Og awards. In 2017, he won the Crown at the National Eisteddfod of Wales.

He regularly presents the hymn-singing programme Dechrau Canu, Dechrau Canmol on S4C.

References

Living people
Place of birth missing (living people)
Year of birth missing (living people)
Welsh children's writers
Welsh fantasy writers
Welsh television presenters
Welsh-language broadcasters
Welsh-language poets